Nico Schüler (born 5 May 1970) is a German-American music theorist, musicologist, composer, and university professor, whose scholarly work has been reviewed in peer-reviewed journals. He is listed in the Biography and Genealogy Master Index, in Who's Who in America and in Who's Who of Emerging Leaders.

Life 
Born in Roßlau (Germany), Schüler grew up in Greifswald and studied music education, musicology, philosophy, and computer science at the University of Greifswald and at Humboldt University of Berlin. In 2000, he received a Ph.D. in music theory from Michigan State University with a dissertation on computer-assisted music analysis. After two years of teaching at Central Michigan University (1999-2001), he joined Texas State University as Assistant Professor and Coordinator of Music Theory in 2001. He was promoted to associate professor in 2006, to Professor in 2009, and named University Distinguished Professor of Music Theory and Musicology in 2017.

Work 
Schüler's publications are on the rediscovery of forgotten or underrepresented composers (e.g., Jacob J. Sawyer), computer-applications in music research, methodology of music research, music of the 20th century (e.g., Dietrich Erdmann, Hanning Schröder, Kurt Schwaen, or Burkhard Meier), music theory pedagogy, and music historiography. He is the co-editor of the international music research book series Methodology of Music Research. Schüler is an Editorial Board Member of the scholarly journal New Sound, and he was a Keynote Speaker at the 13th Biennial International Conference on Music Theory and Analysis
in Belgrade in 2019. As a composer, he has written piano and electronic music, and he has been an officer of the Texas Chapter of the National Association of Composers USA (NACUSA).

Publications 
 Schüler, Nico. "The Degree of Rubato in Performances of Bach’s Invention No. 9: Two Case Studies", Softwaregestützte Interpretationsforschung, Grundsätze, Desiderate und Grenzen, edited by Julian Caskel, Frithjof Vollmer, and Thomas Wozonig. Würzburg: Königshausen u. Neumann, 2022. pp. 167-179. ISBN 978-3-82-607433-2.
 Schüler, Nico. "Toward a Higher Accuracy of Note Onset Detection", Softwaregestützte Interpreta-tionsforschung, Grundsätze, Desiderate und Grenzen, edited by Julian Caskel, Frithjof Vollmer, and Thomas Wozonig. Würzburg: Königshausen u. Neumann, 2022. pp. 419-424. ISBN 978-3-82-607433-2.
 Schüler, Nico. "Online Research Methods for Rediscovering Forgotten Composers: Using Online Databases and Archives", Music in the Disruptive Era, edited by David Hurwitz and Pedro Ordóñez Eslava. Turnhout: Brepols, 2022. pp. 97–112.
 Schüler, Nico. "Orientation Processes and Perspectivism in the Spatiality of Music-Theoretical Research: Reflections on the Plurality of Modern Methods and Methodology of Music Analysis", Music and Space: Theoretical and Analytical Perspectives, ed. by Ivana Ilić, Jelena Mihajlović-Marković, and Miloš Zatkalik. Belgrade, 2021. pp. 38–58. ISBN 978-86-81340-30-1.
 Schüler, Nico. "Otto Laske and the Visualization of Electro‐Acoustic Music: Laske’s Visual Music Animations", Emille, the Journal of the Korean Electro-Acoustic Music Society 18 (2020): 61–67.
 Schüler, Nico. "Modern Approaches to Teaching Sight Singing and Ear Training", Facta Universitatis – Visual Arts and Music 6/2 (2020): 83–92.
 Schüler, Nico. "Contextuality and Interdisciplinarity in Digital Music Research: History, Current Projects,  and A Case Study," Contextuality of Musicology – What, How, Why and Because, edited by Tijana Popović Mladjenović, Ana Stefanović, Radoš Mitrović, and Vesna Mikić. Belgrade, Serbia: Faculty of Music, 2020. pp. 86–96. ISBN 978-86-81340-25-7.
 Schüler, Nico. "Expressive Timing at the Beginning of Beethoven’s Piano Sonata op. 2 no. 1," Musica Movet: Affectus, Ludus, Corpus, edited by Milena Medić. Belgrade, Serbia: University of Arts, 2019. pp. 177–186. ISBN 9788681340073.
 Schüler, Nico. "Current Research Methodologies For Rediscovering Forgotten Composers: Using Commercial Genealogy And Newspaper Databases And Other Online Archives", Music in Society 2018: 369–386.
 Schüler, Nico. "Computer-Assisted Music Analysis: Historical Reflections, Recent Approaches, and Common Methods", MusikTheorie – Zeitschrift für Musikwissenschaft 32/4 (2017): 317–329.
 Schüler, Nico. "Rediscovering Forgotten Composers with the Help of Online Genealogy and Music Score Databases: A Case Study on African-American Composer Jacob J. Sawyer (1856-1885)", Musicological Annual 51/2 (2015): 85–97.
 Schüler, Nico. Computer-Assisted Music Analysis (1950s-1970s): Essays and Bibliographies. Frankfurt / New York: Peter Lang, 2014. ISBN 978-3-631-39764-0.
 Stefanija, Leon, and Nico Schüler (Eds.): Approaches to Music Research: Between Practice and Epistemology. Frankfurt / New York: Peter Lang, 2011. ISBN 978-3-631-59200-7.
 Stefanija, Leon, Nico Schüler, Tuomas Eerola, Reiko Graham, Vanessa Nering, and Mirjana Veselinović-Hofman: Musical Listening Habits of College Students in Finland, Slovenia, South Africa, and Texas: Similarities and Differences. Frankfurt / New York: Peter Lang, 2010. ISBN 978-3-631-57268-9.
 Schüler, Nico. [Ed.] On Methods of Music Theory and (Ethno-) Musicology: From Interdisciplinary Research to Teaching. Frankfurt / New York: Peter Lang, 2005. ISBN 978-3631543900.
 Schüler, Nico. [Ed.] Computer-Applications in Music Research: Concepts, Methods, Results. New York: Peter Lang, 2002. ISBN 978-3631390320.
 Schüler, Nico. Hanning Schröder. Dokumente und Kritisches Werkverzeichnis [Hanning Schröder. Documents and Critical Catalog of Works], Verdrängte Musik vol. 15, Hamburg: von Bockel, 1996. ISBN 978-3928770675.
 Schüler, Nico. [Ed.] Zwischen Noten- und Gesellschaftssystemen. Festschrift für Cornelia Schröder-Auerbach zum 95. Geburtstag und zum Andenken an Hanning Schröder anläßlich seines 100. Geburtstages, Frankfurt/ M., New York: Peter Lang, 1996. ISBN 978-3631498323.
 Ochs, Ekkehard, and Nico Schüler (Eds.). Festschrift Kurt Schwaen zum 85. Geburtstag. Frankfurt/M., New York: Peter Lang, 1995. ISBN 978-3631475522.
 Schüler, Nico. Zum Problem und zu Methoden von Musikanalyse [On the Problem and on Methods of Music Analysis]. Hamburg: von Bockel, 1996. ISBN 978-3928770798.
 Schüler, Nico. Erkenntnistheorie, Musikwissenschaft, Künstliche Intelligenz und der Prozeß: Ein Gespräch mit Otto Laske, Peenemünde: Dietrich, 1995. ISBN 3-930066-14-9.
 Schüler, Nico, and Dirk Uhrlandt: MUSANA 1.0 / 1.1 - ein Musikanalyseprogramm: Programmdokumentation, Peenemünde: Axel Dietrich, 1994 / 1996 [with a PC disc]. ISBN 3-930066-24-6.
 Schüler, Nico, and Lutz Winkler (Eds.): [On Inter-Regional Music Cultural Relations in the Baltic Area. Papers of the Academic Colloquium within the Scope of the Greifswald Music Days on November 29th, 1992] Zu interregionalen musikkulturellen Beziehungen im Ostseeraum. Referate des wissenschaftlichen Kolloquiums im Rahmen der Greifswalder Musiktage am 29. November 1992. Greifswald, 1993.
 Schüler, Nico (Ed.): [Chamber Music Today 3. Composers, Works, Analyses, Interview] Kammermusik Heute 3. Komponisten, Werke, Analysen, Interview. Greifswald, 1993.
 Schüler, Nico (Ed.): [Chamber Music Today 2. Composers, Works, Analyses, Interviews, Methods] Kammermusik Heute 2. Komponisten, Werke, Analysen, Interviews, Methoden. Greifswald, 1992.
 Schüler, Nico, and Lutz Winkler (Ed.). [Wolfgang Amadeus Mozart. Papers of the Academic Colloquium of the Greifswald Mozart-Days on Dezember 3rd, 1991] Wolfgang Amadeus Mozart. Referate des wissenschaftlichen Kolloquiums der Greifswalder Mozart-Tage am 3. Dezember 1991. Greifswald, 1992.
 Schüler, Nico, and Manfred Vetter (Eds.). [Chamber Music Today. Composers, Musicians, Works, Analyses, Methods] Kammermusik Heute. Komponisten, Interpreten, Werke, Analysen, Methoden. Greifswald, 1991.

References

External links 
 Nico Schüler Homepage.
 
 Nico Schüler's VIAF's Record
 Nico Schüler's ORCID Listing

1970 births
Living people
Music historians
People from Austin, Texas
Musicians from Austin, Texas
Music theorists
20th-century American male musicians
21st-century American male musicians
Texas State University faculty